Torkel Wetterhus (born 29 June 1944) is a Norwegian businessperson and politician.

A forester by education, he works as a farmer. He has been chairman of the board of Sparebanken NOR in Buskerud and of Norske Skog, and a member of the board of the DnB NOR Savings Bank Foundation, Sparebanken NOR nationwide, Gjensidige NOR, the Norwegian Agrarian Association and the Norwegian Forest Owners Association.

As a politician he is a former deputy mayor of Nore og Uvdal municipality and member of Buskerud county council. He was a member of the Conservative Party from 1971, but left the party in 2004. He later joined the Centre Party.

References

1944 births
Living people
Norwegian businesspeople
Norske Skog people
Conservative Party (Norway) politicians
Centre Party (Norway) politicians
Buskerud politicians